Main page: Euroleague 2009–10

The Qualifying round phase of the 2009–10 Euroleague basketball tournament is preceding the regular season. 8 teams will compete in two preliminary rounds, of which 2 teams will advance to the regular season stage.

First preliminary round

Results
All times given below are in Central European Time.

Unless otherwise indicated, all attendance totals are from the corresponding match report posted on the official Euroleague site and included with each game summary.

Game 1

Game 2

Second preliminary round

Results

Game 1

Game 2

External links
Official site

Qualifying round